Parliamentary elections were held in Kyrgyzstan on 5 February 1995, with a second round on 19 February. The Social Democratic Party of Kyrgyzstan emerged as the largest party, with 14 of the 105 seats. Voter turnout was 76%.

Results

References

Kyrgyzstan
Elections in Kyrgyzstan
1995 in Kyrgyzstan
Election and referendum articles with incomplete results